SSC RF "Troitsk Institute of Innovative and Thermonuclear Research" or TRINITY for short ) is a Russian state scientific center (SSC) in the field of controlled thermonuclear fusion, plasma physics, laser physics, and the technology and practical application of impulse sources of power supply based on MHD generators.

It is located in Troitsk, Moscow. It was established in 1956 as the Magnetic Laboratory of the USSR Academy of Sciences by an initiative of the academician Anatoly Aleksandrov.

In 1961, it was merged into Kurchatov Institute as a special sector (later a section). From 1971 it was a subdivision of Kurchatov Institute under the direction of academician Evgeny Velikhov. From 1978 until December 2003 its director was the USSR Academy of Sciences correspondent member Vyacheslav Pismenniy. Currently, its Director is Professor V. E. Cherkovets.

TRINITY was reestablished in 1991 receiving its current name. In 1994 it was granted the status of State Scientific Center (SSC), which was renewed in 1997, 2000, 2002, 2004, and 2007.

TRINITY operates the experimental facility Angara 5-1 and the thermonuclear complex SFT  (Strong Field Tokamak T-11M).

External links
 Official site 
 Official site 
 Russia: Troitsk Institute of Innovative and Thermonuclear Research (TRINITI) at Nuclear Threat Initiative website

Research institutes established in 1956
Research institutes in Russia
Research institutes in the Soviet Union
Nuclear research institutes in Russia
Nuclear technology in the Soviet Union
1956 establishments in the Soviet Union
Troitsk Settlement